The 2015 season was KR's 101st season in Úrvalsdeild and their 37th consecutive season in top-flight of Icelandic Football.

Along with the Úrvalsdeild, the club also competed in the Meistarakeppni KSÍ, the Lengjubikarinn, the Borgunarbikarinn and the 2015–16 UEFA Europa League where they entered in the first qualifying round.

Former KR player and captain Bjarni Guðjónsson head coached the team for the first time after being appointed on 28 October 2014. This was Bjarni's second season as a head coach of a team in the top-flight, having been relegated from the 2014 Úrvalsdeild with Fram. Bjarni was assisted by Guðmundur Benediktsson, also a former KR player. Guðmundur head coached Breiðablik in the 2014 season.

First Team

Current squad

Transfers and loans

Transfers in

Transfers out

Loans out

Preseason

Reykjavík Cup
KR took part in the 2015 Reykjavík Cup, a pre-season tournament for clubs from Reykjavík.

The team played in Group A along with Fjölnir, Fram and Fylkir. KR won their first two games against Fylkir and Fram but lost the third games against Fjölnir and finished second in the group with 6 points.

In the semi-finals KR lost to Leiknir R on penalties after the game had ended 2–2 with Leiknir R scoring the equaliser in the 90th minute.

Lengjubikarinn
KR played in the Icelandic league cup, Lengjubikarinn. They were drawn in Group 2 along with Leiknir R, Víkingur R, Fjölnir, KA, Selfoss, Grótta and Fram. KR lost their first two games, 3–4 against Víkingur R and 0–1 against Fjölnir. In the third round KR recorded their first win, 1–0 against Fram, with Þorsteinn Már scoring the winning goal. KR than defeated Leiknir R 2–1 in the fourth round and draw against KA 2–2 in the fifth. On 26 March, the sixth round, KR won their neighbours in Grótta 4–0. In the seventh round KR drew against Selfoss 1–1 and lost their chance to go second. As Leiknir R had announced they would not compete in the quarter-finals KR were handed their place in the finals.

On 13 April KR withdrew their team from the competition, handing the spot over to KA.

Meistarakeppni KSÍ
KR played 2014 league champions Stjarnan in the Meistarakeppni KSÍ, an annual match contested between the champions of the previous Úrvalsdeild season and the holders of the Borgunarbikarinn on 27 April 2015.

KR lost the game 1–0 with the winning goal coming in the 82nd minute.

Úrvalsdeild

League table

Matches

Summary of results

Points breakdown
 Points at home: 21
 Points away from home: 21
 6 Points: Fylkir, Keflavík, Leiknir R., Víkingur R.
 4 Points: ÍBV
 3 Points: FH, Fjölnir, Stjarnan
 2 Points: Breiðablik, ÍA
 1 Point: Valur
 0 Points:

Borgunarbikarinn
KR came into the Icelandic cup, Borgunarbikarinn, in the 32nd-finals and were drawn against Keflavík. KR won the game comfortably 0–5.

In the 16th-finals the team was drawn against KV. KR won the game 7–1. Pálmi Rafn scored his first hat trick for the club.

KR won FH in the quarter finals 2–1 at home. Gary Martin scored the winning goal on the 61st minute after Kassim Doumbia had equalised following Óskar Örn's goal.

In the semi finals KR won an easy victory against ÍBV 4–1, having controlled the game from the first minute. Hólmbert Aron scored two of the four goals.

KR played Valur in the cup final and lost 2–0. Valur dominated the game and broke the deadlock on the 71st minute with a goal from Bjarni Ólafur. Kristinn Ingi doubled the lead for Valur on the 87th minute. KR played below par and had few chances in the game.

Europa League
KR came into the 2015–16 UEFA Europa League in the 1st qualifying round.

On 22 June KR was drawn against the Irish team Cork City F.C. The first leg ended 1–1 with Óskar Örn scoring KR's only goal and handing KR crucial away goal. KR won the second leg 2–1 after extra time. The team had gone behind and had a player sent off in the first half.

In the second qualifying round KR was drawn against Rosenborg. In the first leg Rosenborg controlled the play for most of the game and won the match 1–0 courtesy of a penalty goal from Pål André Helland. Hólmbert Aron played his first ever game for KR when he came on as a substitute on the 67th minute. In the second leg Rosenborg killed the tie in the first 18 minutes of the game scoring three goals and winning the tie 4–0.

First qualifying round

Second qualifying round

Squad statistics

Goalscorers
Includes all competitive matches.

Appearances
Includes all competitive matches. Numbers in parentheses are sub-appearances.

Disciplinary record
Includes all competitive matches.

References

External links
 Knattspyrnufélag Reykjavíkur Official Site
 KR Reykjavík – Knattspyrnufélag Reykjavíkur Fan Site

Úrvalsdeild karla (football)
Knattspyrnufélag Reykjavíkur seasons
Knattspyrnufélag Reykjavíkur
KR